The 2014 Rochford District Council election took place on 22 May 2014 to elect members of the Rochford District Council in England. They were held on the same day as other local elections.

References

2014 English local elections
2014
2010s in Essex